Chris Albany Williams (born January 2, 1959) is a former American football player who played professionally in the National Football League (NFL) as a defensive back for the Buffalo Bills for three seasons. He was selected by the Bills in the second round of the 1981 NFL draft. He had three interceptions and a fumble recovery in his professional career, all in 1983, in which he played in all 16 regular season games.

Williams was born in Alexandria, Louisiana and attended Tioga High School in Tioga, Louisiana. He attended college at Louisiana State University, where he was selected as first-team All-Southeastern Conference by the Associated Press in 1980 while playing college football for the LSU Tigers. Chris still holds the all time record for interceptions (20) at LSU as well as ties for the single season record (8 in 1978).

References

Living people
1959 births
Sportspeople from Alexandria, Louisiana
Players of American football from Louisiana
LSU Tigers football players
Buffalo Bills players
American football defensive backs